Altagonum sedlaceki is a species of ground beetle in the subfamily Carabinae. It was described by Louwerens in 1969. The species is found in Papua New Guinea.

References

sedlaceki
Beetles described in 1969
Beetles of Australia